Nova Bavaria is a small football stadium in the city of Kharkiv, Ukraine. Until 2020, it was known as Helios Arena.

History
The stadium is among the oldest in the city and initially was called Stadion Kanatnoho Zavodu (Rope Factory Stadium). It is located in a historic neighborhood Nova Bavaria. In 1982-1991 it was used by the Soviet club FC Mayak Kharkiv.

Later around 2000 belonged to FC Arsenal Kharkiv which in 2004 updated the stadium that by that time was falling apart. It was renamed as Arsenal–Bavaria stadium. In 2004-2009 the stadium was used as a home field of Arsenal Kharkiv.

In 2009 it was acquired by FC Helios Kharkiv and was renamed as Helios–Arena. In 2009-2012 it was used by Helios as a home turf. After Helios moved to the newly built Sonyachnyi stadium located up north of the city, since 2012 the stadium was used for training. Since 2017 Helios Arena once again became a home to Helios.

Gallery

References

Football venues in Kharkiv Oblast
Sport in Kharkiv
Buildings and structures in Kharkiv
FC Helios Kharkiv
Sports venues in Kharkiv Oblast